John Joseph Murphy (July 14, 1908 – January 14, 1970) was an All-Star American right-handed relief pitcher in Major League Baseball (1932, 1934–43, 1946–47) who later became a front office executive in the game.

Yankees' relief ace
In 1934, his first full season with the Yankees, Murphy started 20 games (completing 10); for the remaining 11 years of his major league career, he would start only 20 games more, as he became one of the top bullpen specialists of his day. Moreover, his Yankees were one of the most powerful teams of all time, winning consecutive World Series championships from 1936 to 1939, and again in 1941 and 1943. Murphy's teammates included Lou Gehrig, Joe DiMaggio, Bill Dickey, Red Ruffing, Lefty Gomez—and, through 1934, Babe Ruth. Murphy spent his final year in the American League with the 1947 Boston Red Sox, the Yankees' arch-rivals.

Overall, he appeared in 415 games, winning 93, losing 53 (for a winning percentage of .637) with an earned run average of 3.50. He led the AL in wins for a relief pitcher seven times. While the save was not then an official statistic, Murphy four times led the AL in that category. In eight World Series games and  innings (spread over six different Series), Murphy won two games, lost none, saved four, and posted an ERA of 1.10. Nicknamed "Fordham Johnny", "Fireman" and "Grandma" (either for his rocking-chair pitching motion, or his fastidious nature), Murphy was on seven World Series winning teams, the most of any pitcher in history.

Executive with Red Sox and Mets
When his playing days ended, Murphy briefly scouted for the Red Sox, then entered the Boston front office when owner Tom Yawkey appointed him Director of Minor League Operations. Murphy spent 13 seasons running the Red Sox' farm and scouting systems until his dismissal following the  season. In 1961, he joined former Yankees farm director and general manager George Weiss in the front office of Gotham's National League expansion team, the New York Mets.

Rising to the position of vice president, Murphy briefly donned a uniform and joined the Mets' coaching staff for the final 11 games of the  campaign during Salty Parker's term as acting manager. Then, following that season, Murphy returned to the Met front office and took over the general manager responsibilities when Bing Devine returned to his longtime employers, the St. Louis Cardinals.

Front-office boss of "Miracle Mets"
As one of his first tasks, Murphy secured the services of manager Gil Hodges, under contract to the Washington Senators, by acquiring Hodges in a November 27, 1967, trade for pitcher Bill Denehy. Murphy's promotion to the GM role also coincided with the Mets' unveiling of some of the best young pitching talent of the era—including Tom Seaver, Nolan Ryan, Jerry Koosman, Tug McGraw, and others. With Hodges in command, the 1969 Miracle Mets stunned the baseball community by winning the NL East, sweeping Atlanta in the NLCS, then defeating a heavily favored Baltimore Orioles squad in five World Series games.

Death
However, not quite three months later, Murphy suffered a heart attack and died at age 61 early on January 14, 1970, in New York City. He was succeeded by Bob Scheffing.

His older brother Thomas was a federal prosecutor and judge.

See also
 List of Major League Baseball annual saves leaders
 Major League Baseball titles leaders

References

External links

The Deadball Era

1908 births
1970 deaths
Albany Senators players
Boston Red Sox executives
Boston Red Sox players
Boston Red Sox scouts
Burials at Woodlawn Cemetery (Bronx, New York)
Fordham Preparatory School alumni
Fordham Rams baseball players
Major League Baseball farm directors
Major League Baseball general managers
Major League Baseball pitchers
Major League Baseball scouting directors
Newark Bears (IL) players
New York Mets coaches
New York Mets executives
New York Yankees players
St. Paul Saints (AA) players
Scottdale Scotties players
Baseball players from New York City